Metro FM is a nationwide FM radio network broadcasting from İstanbul.

It is one of the first privately founded radio stations in Turkey and the first foreign music station. Broadcasting Pop Music in other languages than Turkish, Metro FM can be listened to via terrestrial broadcast, Turksat 2A Satellite, BlackBerry and iPhone applications.

Founded by the private Uzan Group, Metro FM remained one of the media branches of the holding for over ten years. The station briefly stayed under government entity after the takeover of the Uzan Holding companies by government banking regulation agency TMSF. With the auction held in September 2005, Metro FM has been sold to the Canadian communication group Canwest for a sum of US$22,850,000. Failing its operations in Turkey as a result of the 2007 global recession, Canwest has sold Metro FM along with its sister stations Süper FM, Joy FM and Joy Türk to Spectrum Medya, one of the domestic investment fund Actera Group’s companies. The name of the company has been changed to Karnaval Media.

Since its foundation in 1992, Metro FM has always been among the first two foreign music radio stations in the country by terms of rating.  The station manager and program/music director of the radio is Cengiz Ünsal.

Metro Fm Weekly Schedule 

To be edited sooner

External links 
Metro FM Website

Radio stations in Turkey
Radio stations established in 1992
Mass media in Istanbul